Jeong Seon-hong (born 12 October 1938) is a South Korean volleyball player. He competed in the men's tournament at the 1964 Summer Olympics.

References

External links
 

1938 births
Living people
South Korean men's volleyball players
Olympic volleyball players of South Korea
Volleyball players at the 1964 Summer Olympics
Place of birth missing (living people)
Asian Games medalists in volleyball
Volleyball players at the 1966 Asian Games
Medalists at the 1966 Asian Games
Asian Games silver medalists for South Korea
20th-century South Korean people